Jim O'Sullivan may refer to:
Jim O'Sullivan, husband of Irish businesswoman Margaret Molloy
Jim O'Sullivan (hurler), member of Cork Junior Hurling Team 1994 
Jim O'Sullivan (police commissioner), commissioner 1992–2000 of Queensland Police Service
Jim O'Sullivan (athlete), Australian 400m silver medallist in 1977 Pacific Conference Games
Jim O'Sullivan (engineer), Chief Executive of Highways England